My Dinner with Jimi is a 2003 comedy film written by Howard Kaylan, dealing with events in 1966-67 which led up to the night in 1967 when the Turtles encountered the Beatles and Kaylan had dinner with Jimi Hendrix in London, England. The film also depicts other 1960s rock icons like Brian Jones, Frank Zappa, Donovan, Cass Elliott and Jim Morrison. The film was given an extremely limited theatrical release in Toronto in late September 2007.

Background

Plot
The story focuses on the Turtles in the days leading up to and following the success of their single "Happy Together". Howard Kaylan and Mark Volman receive their draft cards and Frank Zappa tells them to seek advice from Herb Cohen, Zappa's manager and Kaylan's cousin, to avoid being drafted in the Vietnam War. Cohen advises Kaylan to show up to the draft board intoxicated from drug use, not to bathe or sleep, and to behave so obnoxiously that the Army will not draft him, leading Kaylan and Volman to engage in a sleepless night of marijuana smoking before their draft review, which they fail due to being high while taking the tests, and Kaylan pretending to be homosexual in front of the physician and expressing psychotic views to the psychiatrist.

Because they avoid the draft, the Turtles fly to England where Graham Nash and Donovan play them an advance reel to reel recording of the unreleased Beatles album Sgt. Pepper's Lonely Hearts Club Band, which the Turtles declare to be the greatest album they ever heard. At a nearby pub, the Turtles have a disastrous meeting with the Beatles, in which Turtles guitarist Jim Tucker is verbally abused by John Lennon, leading the Turtles to leave the bar as Kaylan stays behind and Brian Jones, the founder of the Rolling Stones, introduces Kaylan to Jimi Hendrix, who Kaylan ends up having dinner and a conversation with, while the two drink much alcohol and smoke marijuana, with the evening ultimately ending with Kaylan vomiting on Hendrix' suit.

Kaylan ultimately purchases copies of Sgt. Pepper and the Jimi Hendrix Experience's debut, Are You Experienced? and Tucker quits the Turtles and the music industry, never getting over his treatment by John Lennon,<ref>[http://musoscribe.com/features/howard_kaylan_my_dinner_with_jimi.shtml Howard Kaylan interview: "My Dinner with Jimi". Musoscribe.com by Bill Kopp] Retrieved 18-02-11</ref> although the postscript states that Tucker remains a fan of the Beatles' music.

Cast

Starring
Justin Henry as Howard Kaylan
Jason Boggs as Mark Volman
Royale Watkins as Jimi Hendrix
Sean Maysonet as Jim Tucker

Special appearances
John Corbett as Henry Diltz
George Wendt as Bill Uttley
Taylor Negron as the psychiatrist
Curtis Armstrong as Herb Cohen
Jay Michael Ferguson as Brian Jones
Brian Groh as John Lennon
Quinton Flynn as Paul McCartney
Jimm Marie Simon as Jane Asher
Nate Dushku as George Harrison
Ben Bode as Ringo Starr
Lisa Brounstein as Mama Cass Elliot
Bret Roberts as Jim Morrison
Adam Tomei as Frank Zappa
Chris Soldevilla as Graham Nash

ReceptionMy Dinner with Jimi'' received the best screenplay award at the 2003 Slamdunk Film Festival in Park City, Utah, and was well received when it was shown as part of the Santa Monica Film Festival.

References

External links
 
 
 

2003 comedy films
2003 films
American comedy films
American rock music films
Comedy films based on actual events
American films about cannabis
The Beatles in film
Frank Zappa
Cultural depictions of Jimi Hendrix
Cultural depictions of John Lennon
Cultural depictions of the Beatles
Cultural depictions of the Rolling Stones
Cultural depictions of Jim Morrison
The Turtles
Stoner films
Films directed by Bill Fishman
2000s English-language films
2000s American films